Indre Øksningan (Inner Øksningan) is an island in the municipality of Herøy in Nordland county, Norway. Together with Ytre Øksningan, it is part of the Øksningan archipelago. It is connected to the rest of Herøy by the Kalvøyrevet Bridge and Norwegian County Road 166.

See also
List of islands of Norway

References

Islands of Nordland
Herøy, Nordland